The office of the vice president of the Presidency of the SFR Yugoslavia existed from the enactment of constitutional amendments establishing the position in 1971 until the dissolution of the country by 1992. A collective presidency existed in Yugoslavia since amendments to the constitution in 1971. The amendments established the roles of President and Vice President within the collective Presidency which would rotate between individual republics and provinces on an annual basis. However, it also defined a separate title of President of the Republic which could be conferred by the Federal Assembly into Josip Broz Tito who would automatically preside over the Presidency as well (and thus delay the implementation of the President of the Presidency role). Therefore, the launch of the Vice Presidency of the Presidency in 1971 would be the first to carry out a rotation system. Krste Crvenkovski of SR Macedonia was the first to hold the office. The subsequent order after SR Macedonia was SR Bosnia and Herzegovina, SR Slovenia, SR Serbia, SR Croatia, SR Montenegro, SAP Vojvodina, and SAP Kosovo. In 1974 a new Constitution was adopted which reaffirmed the collective federal presidency consisting of representatives of the six republics, the two autonomous provinces within Serbia and (until 1988) the President of the League of Communists.

The 1974 constitution affirmed Josip Broz Tito with an unlimited mandate which ensured the new office of President of the Presidency would not come into effect until after his death. The first President of the Presidency was to be the then standing Vice President of the Presidency. When Broz died on 4 May 1980, the then Vice President of the Presidency Lazar Koliševski acceded to the role of President of the Presidency.

List

See also
Vice President of Yugoslavia
Head of state of Yugoslavia
President of Yugoslavia
President of the Presidency of Yugoslavia
Presidency of Yugoslavia

References

Socialist Federal Republic of Yugoslavia
Yugoslavia
1971 establishments in Yugoslavia
1992 disestablishments in Yugoslavia